Totally Games was a video game developer located in Marin County, California. Their titles included the X-wing series of games based on the Star Wars universe, a series of PC-based World War II flight combat simulations (Battlehawks 1942, Their Finest Hour: The Battle of Britain, and Secret Weapons of the Luftwaffe) and Bridge Commander based on the Star Trek universe. They created Secret Weapons over Normandy in 2003 for the PS2, Xbox and PC. They broadened their scope to create products for the PSP and the Wii (Alien Syndrome) and an interconnected theme park/internet experience, Buzz Lightyear Astroblasters, commemorating the 50th anniversary of Disneyland. The company was originally founded in 1985 as a sole proprietorship, incorporated in 1993 as Peregrine Software and soon thereafter renamed Totally Games by Lawrence Holland, a Cornell University graduate.

History
Lawrence Holland began developing games in 1983, beginning with Spike's Peak, then Super Zaxxon and Project Space Station,  with publisher HESWare. He went independent in 1985 and contracted with Lucasfilm Games to do the Apple II and Commodore 64 versions of naval simulations PHM Pegasus and its sequel, Strike Fleet for publication by Electronic Arts. From this point, Holland proposed the design for Battlehawks 1942 and hired his own team while working closely with Lucasfilm Games. That small sole proprietorship was the precursor to Totally Games which was incorporated in 1993 as Peregrine Software and renamed Totally Games in 1994.

Totally Games changed its business model in October 2008 to a virtual model and continued developing innovative projects beyond the traditional game publishing environment. Lawrence Holland continues to design games and related software, working with a close-knit team developing on traditional and new platforms including the web, iPhone, and social media platforms.

List of games
1988 - Battlehawks 1942
1989 - Their Finest Hour: The Battle of Britain
1991 - Secret Weapons of the Luftwaffe
1993 - Star Wars: X-Wing
1994 - Star Wars: TIE Fighter
1997 - Star Wars: X-Wing vs. TIE Fighter
1998 - Star Wars: X-Wing Collector Series
1999 - Star Wars: X-Wing Alliance
2002 - Star Trek: Bridge Commander
2002 - Knights of Decayden (cancelled)
2003 - Secret Weapons Over Normandy
2005 - Buzz Lightyear Astro Blasters
2006 - Special project for DARPA
2007 - Alien Syndrome
2008 - Dora the Explorer: Dora Saves the Mermaids
2008 - PBR: Out of the Chute2009 - Cisco Mind Share Game (for Cisco Systems)
2009 - Oceanis (downloadable PC game with Nickelodeon)
2010 - GoldWalker (iPhone)
2011 - Beachtown'' (Facebook)

References

External links
Totally Games official website

Defunct video game companies of the United States
Video game development companies
Companies based in San Rafael, California
Video game companies established in 1994
Video game companies disestablished in 2015